Tamil Nadu Housing Board (TNHB) is a government organisation in Tamil Nadu, India.

History
Formed in 1947 as a small organisation in the name of "City Improvement Trust" in order to cater to the housing needs of Madras City, the trust has developed into a full-fledged organisation named the "Tamil Nadu Housing Board" in 1961 to cope with the increasing demand in housing sector all over the state due to urban growth leading to migration to urban areas in search of employment opportunities. It is under the control of the Department of Housing and Urban Development.

Activities
TNHB has the unique capacity of developing very large neighbourhood schemes, each one of them, remains a self-contained neighbourhood by itself. As a pioneer institution in developing very large neighbourhood schemes, Tamil Nadu Housing Board is one of the biggest institutions in India catering to the shelter needs of various income groups of the society.

Keeping in line with the Chief Minister's direction of good governance and effective delivery system, the TNHB decided to put in place the concept of Service Counters.

TNHB has created self-sustaining townships in the late 1970s and early 1980s like Anna Nagar, Besant Nagar, K. K. Nagar, Ashok Nagar, Korattur and Shastri Nagar. Owing to the elevation in economic activity to the south of Chennai, it has created self-sustaining township in Sholinganallur with wide roads, residential plots, apartments, school and park zones. It has also completed midsize neighbourhood developments in Velachery, Mogappair and Chitlapakkam. Other promotions are also seen as small and mid-sized neighbourhoods in tier-II cities like Coimbatore and Madurai.

All residential township developments of TNHB have been a success due to their compliance to the development rules and their not-for-profit motive. As the land required for TNHB layouts are either owned or acquired by the government, they do not cut corners in layout developments which results in suburbs with wide roads and all amenities such as schools, parks, play grounds and bus terminuses. The organisation caters to all sectors of the society through their HIG, MIG and LIG offerings.

References

External links 
 Official Website
 Official Site of Documents of the Housing and Urban Development Department

Housing in Tamil Nadu
State agencies of Tamil Nadu
Government agencies established in 1961
1961 establishments in Madras State